National Institute of Technology, Ishikawa College (NIT, Ishikawa College) (former English name was "Ishikawa National College of Technology" until 2015) is one of national 5-year Colleges of technology (kōsen), in Ishikawa Prefecture, Japan. The college accepts junior high school graduates for a five-year program (associate bachelor's degree) or a seven-year program (advanced course.) From early in the program and throughout, It provides a highly technical education in order to meet the demands in society for engineers with practical knowledge.

International Exchanges
Hangzhou Vocational & Technical College, China, since 2007
Dalian Vocational & Technical College, China, since 2009
Dalian Polytechnic University, China, since 2012
Minghsin University of Science and Technology, Taiwan, since 2016
Hanoi Architectural University, Vietnam, since 2016

References

External links
 Official Website (in  English)
 Official Website(in Japanese)

Universities and colleges in Japan